Migas is a genus of spiders in the family Migidae. Most species are found only in New Zealand.

Taxonomy
The genus Migas was erected by Ludwig Koch in 1873, for the species Migas paradoxus. Of the 34 species accepted , 26 were described by C. L. Wilton in 1968, all from New Zealand. Many of the species are very similar in external appearance, being distinguished by the internal structure of the female genitalia.

Species
, the World Spider Catalog accepted the following extant species:

Migas affinis Berland, 1924 – New Caledonia
Migas australis Wilton, 1968 – New Zealand
Migas borealis Wilton, 1968 – New Zealand
Migas cambridgei Wilton, 1968 – New Zealand
Migas cantuarius Wilton, 1968 – New Zealand
Migas centralis Wilton, 1968 – New Zealand
Migas cumberi Wilton, 1968 – New Zealand
Migas distinctus O. Pickard-Cambridge, 1880 – New Zealand
Migas gatenbyi Wilton, 1968 – New Zealand
Migas giveni Wilton, 1968 – New Zealand
Migas goyeni Wilton, 1968 – New Zealand
Migas hesperus Wilton, 1968 – New Zealand
Migas hollowayi Wilton, 1968 – New Zealand
Migas insularis Wilton, 1968 – New Zealand
Migas kirki Wilton, 1968 – New Zealand
Migas kochi Wilton, 1968 – New Zealand
Migas linburnensis Wilton, 1968 – New Zealand
Migas lomasi Wilton, 1968 – New Zealand
Migas marplesi Wilton, 1968 – New Zealand
Migas minor Wilton, 1968 – New Zealand
Migas nitens Hickman, 1927 – Australia (Tasmania)
Migas otari Wilton, 1968 – New Zealand
Migas paradoxus L. Koch, 1873 (type species) – New Zealand
Migas plomleyi Raven & Churchill, 1989 – Australia (Tasmania)
Migas quintus Wilton, 1968 – New Zealand
Migas sandageri Goyen, 1890 – New Zealand
Migas saxatilis Wilton, 1968 – New Zealand
Migas secundus Wilton, 1968 – New Zealand
Migas solitarius Wilton, 1968 – New Zealand
Migas taierii Todd, 1945 – New Zealand
Migas tasmani Wilton, 1968 – New Zealand
Migas toddae Wilton, 1968 – New Zealand
Migas tuhoe Wilton, 1968 – New Zealand
Migas variapalpus Raven, 1984 – Australia (Queensland)

References

Migidae
Mygalomorphae genera